Margulis is a surname that, like its variants, is derived from the Ashkenazi Hebrew pronunciation of the Hebrew word  (Israeli Hebrew ), meaning 'pearl.' Notable people and characters with the name include:
 Berl Broder (born Margulis), Broder singer
 Dan Margulis, author, expert on color correction and image retouching
 , Hero of the Soviet Union
 Evgeny Margulis, Russian musician
 Grigory Margulis (born 1946), Russian mathematician, known for the Margulis lemma
 Lynn Margulis (1938–2011), American evolutionary biologist
 Margulis, a villain from the game series Xenosaga

See also

Notes

Jewish surnames
Hebrew-language surnames